SAP Concur (formerly Concur Technologies) is an American SaaS company providing travel and expense management services to businesses.  It is headquartered in Bellevue, Washington. SAP SE agreed to acquire Concur Technologies in September 2014 for $8.3 billion.  The deal was completed in December 2014.

History
SAP Concur was co-founded by Mike Hilton and brothers Rajeev Singh and Steve Singh. It is now headed by Mike Eberhard, and part of SAP's Business Network Group, beside SAP Ariba and SAP Fieldglass.

The company is headquartered in Bellevue, Washington, with additional offices in Eden Prairie and St. Louis Park, Minnesota, Allen, Texas, and Vienna, Virginia, in the USA, as well as in Asia, Australia, and Europe.

SAP entered into an agreement to acquire Concur Technologies for US$8.3 billion.  The acquisition was completed on December 4, 2014.

In 2016, Concur acquired Hipmunk, a startup company offering a flight and hotel search website.

During an August 2018 briefing, the Department of Defense announced that it was partnering with SAP Concur to update the Defense Travel System used for active duty, reserve, and civilian personnel of the DOD.

Competitors 
 Amadeus IT Group
 Chrome River Technologies
 Coupa
 Egencia
 Expedia Group's Corporate Travel
 Expensify
 Lola.com
 Pana
 Sabre Getthere
 TripActions
 Webexpenses
 Botmatic solution
 Happay

See also 
 Application service provider
 Expense management
 Fieldglass
 Web application

External links

References 

2014 mergers and acquisitions
American subsidiaries of foreign companies
Companies based in Bellevue, Washington
Companies formerly listed on the Nasdaq
Expense management
SAP SE acquisitions
Software companies based in Washington (state)
Software companies established in 1993
Software companies of the United States
Travel management